A35 or A-35 may refer to:
 A-35 anti-ballistic missile system, a system deployed around Moscow, currently upgraded to the A-135 system
 Aero A.35, a Czech airliner of the 1930s
 Archambault A35, a French sailboat design
 Archambault A35R, a French sailboat design
 Austin A35, a car made by the British Motor Corporation under the Austin Motor Company marque
 Junkers A 35, a German aircraft of the 1920s
 Vultee A-35, a US attack aircraft of World War II, an improved version of the A-31 Vengeance

and also :
 English Opening, Encyclopaedia of Chess Openings code

Roads
 A35 expressway (Canada), a road in Quebec connecting Saint-Jean-sur-Richelieu at the United States border and A-10 in Chambly
 A35 road (England), a road connecting Honiton, Devon and Southampton, Hampshire
 A35 motorway (France), a road connecting the German and the Swiss borders via Strasbourg
 
 A35 motorway (Netherlands), a road connecting Enschede and Wierden
 A35 motorway (Spain), a road in Valencia connecting Xàtiva and the N-340/ CV-40 to Almansa
 A35 road (Sri Lanka), a road connecting Paranthan and Mullaitivu

See also
 List of highways numbered 35